Cedar Lake is an artificial lake in the San Bernardino Mountains of California that has appeared in dozens of Western films. It is the centerpiece of Cedar Lake Camp, a private retreat center owned and operated by Cedar Lake Camp, Inc., a non profit public benefit corporation.

Located south of the city of Big Bear Lake in San Bernardino County and San Bernardino National Forest, the lake lies about two hours east of Los Angeles and two hours north of San Diego.

The lake is formed by a dam across a minor tributary of Metcalf Creek. The creek feeds Metcalf Bay, an arm of Big Bear Lake, whose waters reach the Pacific Ocean by way of Bear Creek and the Santa Ana River.

History 

In 1913, the Talmadge brothers purchased the property where the lake, dam, and camp are now situated. They used the land to graze cattle, then sold it in 1922 to the Bartlett brothers, who built the dam in 1928. They in turn sold it in 1937 to family member Guy Bartlett, who charged visitors 25¢ for admission to the property. In January 1955, the First Congregational Church of Los Angeles bought .

The lake's scenery and proximity to Hollywood made it a popular filming location. It appeared in more than forty films, including:
 Brigham Young (1940)
 High Sierra (1941) and
 The Parent Trap (1961)

It also appeared in six television series, including:
 at least eight episodes of Bonanza
 a 1959 episode of Have Gun–Will Travel and
 The Roy Rogers Show

On May 19, 2010, a 29-year-old man drowned in the lake after his canoe capsized.

Cedar Lake Dam 

Cedar Lake Dam was built in 1928 across Talmadge Creek.

The old mill house and water wheel can be seen in the Bonanza episode "Thornton's Account".

Nomenclature 

There are two other Cedar Lakes in California, both in Siskiyou County:

See also 
 List of dams and reservoirs in California
 List of lakes of California

References

External links 

Reservoirs in San Bernardino County, California
Big Bear Valley
San Bernardino Mountains
Dams in California
San Bernardino National Forest
Reservoirs in Southern California